Kim Gyong-ho (born 19 January 1955) is a North Korean sports shooter. He competed at the 1976 Summer Olympics and the 1980 Summer Olympics.

References

1955 births
Living people
North Korean male sport shooters
Olympic shooters of North Korea
Shooters at the 1976 Summer Olympics
Shooters at the 1980 Summer Olympics
Place of birth missing (living people)
Asian Games medalists in shooting
Shooters at the 1974 Asian Games
Shooters at the 1978 Asian Games
Shooters at the 1982 Asian Games
Asian Games gold medalists for North Korea
Asian Games silver medalists for North Korea
Asian Games bronze medalists for North Korea
Medalists at the 1974 Asian Games
Medalists at the 1978 Asian Games
Medalists at the 1982 Asian Games
20th-century North Korean people